Nicholas August Vogel (born February 5, 1990) is an American volleyball coach and former professional volleyball player.

Early life and education 
Vogel attended Steele Canyon High School (2004–2007) & Valhalla High School (2007–2008). He graduated UCLA in 2012 with a BA in Anthropology.

Career

Playing
Vogel played NCAA volleyball for the 19-time National Champion UCLA Bruins from 2009 to 2012 and also played for Team USA in the 2009 FIVB Men's Junior World Championship and the 2011 Pan American Games. After graduating from college in 2012, he played for Panathinaikos Athens for the 2012–2013 professional season. Vogel the played in Germany's Bundesliga for TV Bühl for the 2013–2014 season and then VfB Friedrichshafen for the 2014–2015 season where they competed in the CEV Champions League and were German Cup and Bundesliga Champions.

Coaching
Vogel retired from playing volleyball in 2015 after being diagnosed with Marfan syndrome. Since then he has worked as a volleyball coach. In 2015, he was a volunteer assistant coach for UCLA Bruins women's volleyball. In August 2016, he became an assistant coach for UC San Diego Tritons men's volleyball. From 2018–2021, Vogel was an assistant coach for DePaul Blue Demons women's volleyball. In June 2022, Vogel joined the UCLA Bruins men's volleyball team as an assistant coach.

Clubs
  Panathinaikos Athens (2012–2013)
  TV Bühl (2013–2014)
  VfB Friedrichshafen (2014–2015)

References

External links
 
 UCLA Player Bio
 1st Men's Team at TV Ingersoll Bühl
 US Men's Volleyball Players Abroad

1990 births
Living people
American men's volleyball players
American volleyball coaches
Panathinaikos V.C. players
Place of birth missing (living people)
Sportspeople from San Diego County, California
People with Marfan syndrome
UCLA Bruins men's volleyball players
UCLA Bruins women's volleyball coaches
UCLA Bruins men's volleyball coaches
UC San Diego Tritons coaches
San Diego Toreros women's volleyball coaches
DePaul Blue Demons women's volleyball